Columbus Day is a national holiday in the United States of America.

Columbus Day may also refer to:

 Columbus Day (film), directed by Charles Burmeister
 Columbus Day Storm of 1962, a storm which occurred in the Pacific Northwest

See also
 Columbus (disambiguation)